Álvaro Véliz (born February 9, 1972, Santiago, Chile), is a Chilean singer. He represented Chile at the 2006 Viña del Mar International Song Festival.

References

1972 births
20th-century Chilean male singers
Living people
People from Santiago
21st-century Chilean male singers
20th-century Chilean male artists